A Banderite or Banderovite was a member of OUN-B, a faction of the Organization of Ukrainian Nationalists, nicknamed "Bandera's people". The term, used from late 1940 onward, derives from the name of Stepan Bandera (1909–1959), head of this faction of the OUN. Because of the brutality utilized by OUN-B members, the colloquial term Banderites quickly earned a negative connotation, particularly among Poles and Jews. By 1942, the expression was well-known and frequently used in western Ukraine to describe the Ukrainian Insurgent Army partisans, OUN-B members or any other Ukrainian perpetrators. The OUN-B, had been engaged in various atrocities, including murder of civilians, most of whom were ethnic Poles, Jews and Romani people. Bandera was not personally engaged in the atrocities but some historians have noted that the term "Banderites" was used by Bandera’s followers themselves during the Holocaust and the massacres of Poles that resulted in the deaths of 80,000–100,000 Poles and 10,000–15,000 Ukrainians. The survivors of these atrocities also frequently defined the perpetrators as Banderites. The term was also a key propaganda term for the post-war Soviet state and more recently for Russia, often used as pejorative term for Ukrainians.

History

The Organization of Ukrainian Nationalists (OUN) was a Ukrainian nationalist organisation founded in 1929 in Vienna. Bandera joined it that year, and quickly climbed through the ranks, becoming the second in command of OUN in Galicia in 1932–1933, and the head of the OUN national executive in Galicia in June 1933.

The OUN carried out the June 1934 assassination of Bronisław Pieracki, Poland's Minister of the Interior. The then 25-year-old Bandera provided the assassin with the murder weapon, a 7.65 mm calibre pistol. His subsequent arrest and conviction turned Bandera into an instant legend among the militant Ukrainian nationalists of the Second Polish Republic. Bandera, who escaped from prison after the German invasion of Poland in September 1939, offered his services to Nazi Germany in exchange for ongoing financial and logistical support.

Since 1939, the OUN had been led by Andriy Atanasovych Melnyk, a founder member. He had been chosen for his more moderate and pragmatic stance; his supporters admired Mussolini's fascism but condemned Nazism. However, a younger and more radical Nazism-supporting faction of the OUN were dissatisfied.
	
On 10 February 1941, a conference for OUN leadership was held in Kraków, Poland. The radical contingent refused to accept Melnyk as head of the OUN and instead named Bandera. This led to the split of the OUN in the spring of 1941 into two groups: OUN-B (Banderites), who were more militant, younger and supported Bandera, and OUN-M (Melnykites), who were generally older and more ideological. In February 1941, Bandera became the leader (Providnyk) of the OUN-B faction or the Banderivtsi.

After the start of the Axis invasion of the Soviet Union on 22 June 1941 (Operation Barbarossa), the OUN-B in the person of Yaroslav Stetsko declared an independent Ukrainian state on 30 June 1941 in occupied Lviv, while the region was under the control of Nazi Germany, pledging to work closely with Germany, which was presented as freeing Ukrainians from Russian oppression. In response, the Nazi authorities suppressed the OUN leadership. In July 1941, Bandera himself was arrested and sent to a concentration camp in Germany. He was imprisoned there until 1944.

In October 1942 the OUN-B established the Ukrainian Insurgent Army (UPA). The OUN-B formed Ukrainian death squads that carried out pogroms and massacres, both independently and with support from the Germans. To ensure the maximum impact of the systematic ethnic cleansing campaign in the contested territory, the OUN-B faction spread antisemitic, racist, and fascist propaganda among the ordinary peasants and other Ukrainians. Aided by Stetsko, Shukhevych, and Lenkavskyi (OUN-B propaganda chief), Bandera wrote a manifesto entitled "Ukrainian National Revolution" that called for the annihilation of so-called ethnic enemies. The manifesto informed the locals how to behave and included specific instructions about the killing of Jews, Poles, and Ukrainian opponents of fascism.

"OUN leaflets appeared on the city streets. They read: "Exterminate the Poles, Jews and communists without mercy. Do not pity the enemies of the Ukrainian National Revolution!"

Bandera did not participate in pogroms; he remained in the area of occupied Kholmshchyna (Polish Chełm Land) further north-west.

The vast majority of pogroms carried out by the Banderites occurred in Eastern Galicia and Volhynia, but also in Bukovina. The most deadly of them was perpetrated in the city of Lviv by the people's militia formed by OUN with direct participation of civilians, at the moment of the German arrival in the Soviet-occupied eastern Poland. There were two Lviv pogroms, carried out in a one-month span, both lasting for several days; the first one from 30 June to 2 July 1941, and the second one from 25 to 29 July 1941. The first pogrom took the lives of at least 4,000 Jews. It was followed by the killing of 2,500 to 3,000 Jews by the Einsatzgruppe C, and the "Petlura Days" massacre of more than 2,000 Polish Jews by Ukrainian militants.

Usage in propaganda 
In Soviet secret records, the word “Banderites” for the first time emerged in late 1940 and began to be used in Soviet propaganda starting in late 1942. The term became a crucial element of the Soviet propaganda discourse and was used as a pejorative description of Ukrainians, sometimes all western Ukrainians in the most negative way. Historian Andrii Portnov noted that "The common noun “Banderivtsi” (“Banderites”) emerged around the time of ethnic cleansing of the Polish population in Volhynia, and it was used to designate all Ukrainian nationalists, but also, on occasion, western Ukrainians or even any person who spoke Ukrainian."

The term has been used by Russian state media against Euromaidan activists to associate a separate Ukrainian national identity with the most radical nationalists. Today, in Russian propaganda, the word is used to refer to all in Ukraine who back the idea of sovereignty from Russia; Ukrainian nationalist collaboration with Nazi Germany is also emphasized.

See also 
Hiwi (volunteer)
Trawniki men

Footnotes

References

Further reading

Valeriy Smoliy (1997), "Small dictionary of Ukrainian history" — Lybid.
G Demyian — "Banderivtsi" — Ternopil dictionary encyclopedia – G Iavorskiy — "Zbruch", 2004-2010, 696p. .

Organization of Ukrainian Nationalists